The 7th Air Division (第七飛行師団, Dai 7 Hikō Shidan) was a land-based aviation force of the Imperial Japanese Army. The division was formed on 29 January 1943 in the Netherlands East Indies as part of the Eighth Area Army. It was incorporated into the Fourth Air Army based at Rabaul on 28 July 1943.

The division moved its headquarters to Wewak in June 1943. The division was disbanded 24 July 1945.

Commanders 
Lt. General Einosuke Sudō (29 January 1943 – 1 February 1945)
Lt. General Chōji Shirokane (1 February 1945 – 16 July 1945)

Organisation
59th Hikō Sentai (1943)
5th Hikō Sentai (1943)
7th Hikō Sentai (1943)
61st Hikō Sentai (1943)

See also
List of air divisions of the Imperial Japanese Army

Notes and references

Shindo, Hiroyuki. 2001, Japanese air operations over New Guinea during the Second World War, Journal of the Australian War Memorial.
Rekishi Dokuhon, Document of the war No. 42 Overview of Imperial Japanese Army Units, Shin-Jinbutsuoraisha Co., Ltd., Tōkyō, Japan, 1998, .

Military units and formations established in 1943
Military units and formations disestablished in 1945
1943 establishments in Japan
1945 disestablishments in Japan
Air Divisions of Japan